Google Takeout, also known as Download Your Data, is a project by the Google Data Liberation Front that allows users of Google products, such as YouTube and Gmail, to export their data to a downloadable archive file.

Usage
Users can select different services from the list of options provided. , the services that can be exported are as follows:

 Google+ +1s, Circles, Pages, Streams and posts
 Chrome Sync bookmarks
 Google Calendar appointments
 Google Contacts
 Google Drive files
 Google Fit
 Google Photos
 Google News
 Google Play Store
 Google Play Console
 Google Play Movies
 Google Play Music
 Google Play Games
 Google Play Books metadata and notes
 Google Groups
 Google Hangouts
 Google Hangouts On Air
 Google Keep
Google Stadia
 Google Tasks
 Google Location History
 Gmail data
 Google Maps My Maps, saved places and reviews
 Google Profile
 Android Device Configuration Service
 Google Home App
 Input Tools
  Classic Sites
 Google Voice billing history, greetings and voicemail recordings
 Google Wallet
 YouTube videos, subscriptions, chats, own comments, playlists, history, live chat messages
 Google Pay
 Search Contributions
 Data Shared For Research
 Shopping Lists
 Textcube
 Google Home 
 Bookmarks
 Hands Free
 Street View

The user can select to export all of the available services or choose services from the above list. Takeout will then process the request and put all the files into a zip file. Takeout then optionally sends an email notification that the export is completed, at which point the user can download the archive from the downloads section of the website. The zip file contains a separate folder for each service that was selected for export.

History 
Google Takeout was created by the Google Data Liberation Front on June 28, 2011 to allow users to export their data from most of Google's services. Since its creation, Google has added several more services to Takeout due to popular demand from users.

Takeout started with exports of only Google Buzz, Google Contacts, Google Profile, Google Streams, and Picasa Albums. The next month, on July 15, 2011, Google added the export of Google +1's to the list after it was frequently requested by Takeout's users. Later in 2011 on September 6, Google added Google Voice to their export service. A big milestone was the addition of YouTube video exports to Takeout next year on September 26, 2012. Google took another big step with the addition of Blogger posts and Google+ pages on February 17, 2013.

On December 5, 2013, Google Takeout was further expanded to include Gmail and Google Calendar data.

Criticism 
Earlier criticisms were raised that Google Takeout did not allow users to export from some core Google services, most notably Google Search history and Google Wallet details. Google has since expanded the service to include search history and Wallet details (September 2016). Google has also added Google Hangouts to the Takeout service. Google also does not delete user data automatically after exporting, they provide a separate service to perform deletion. Google Takeout has also been criticized for keeping the takeout data available for too short a time for many users with large files to easily download everything before the batch expires, in essence "trapping" users with large data and slow bandwidth in Google's services.

References 

Takeout
Internet properties established in 2011